Peter's Pit (or Peters Pit) is a  biological Site of Special Scientific Interest north-east of Snodland in  Kent. It is a Special Area of Conservation

This was formerly a chalk quarry and it has an undulating terrain. There are many ponds, some of which have populations of the great crested newt, a protected species under the Wildlife and Countryside Act 1981. The site has two reptiles, grass snakes and common European adders.

A footpath from Old Church Road goes through the site.

References

Sites of Special Scientific Interest in Kent
Special Areas of Conservation in England